Paramimiculus pterolophioides is a species of beetle in the family Cerambycidae, and the only species in the genus Paramimiculus. It was described by Breuning in 1964.

References

Crossotini
Beetles described in 1964
Monotypic beetle genera